Megachile diasi is a species of bee in the family Megachilidae. It was described by Raw in 2006.

References

Diasi
Insects described in 2006